Ayran, doogh, dhallë, daw, xynogala or tan is a cold savory yogurt-based beverage popular across Western Asia, Central Asia, South Asia, Southeastern Europe, North Asia and Eastern Europe. The principal ingredients are yogurt, water and salt. Herbs such as mint may be optionally added. Some varieties are carbonated.

Etymology
Ayran (cf. airag in Mongolian: 'mare milk',  in Chuvash: 'buttermilk')  is mentioned in Mahmud al-Kashgari's 11th century Dīwān Lughāt al-Turk, although he did not give any information how ayran was made.
The word is derived from the Old Turkic root adır- ("to separate"), cf. Turkish  ("to separate").

Preparation
Ayran is served chilled and often as an accompaniment to grilled meat or rice, especially during summer. It is made by mixing yogurt with chilled or iced water and is sometimes carbonated and seasoned with mint. It has been variously described as "diluted yogurt" and "a most refreshing drink made by mixing yogurt with iced water".

The traditional way of preparing the drink among various Iranic peoples is straight from milk, without yogurt, using a waterskin, known as mashk (مشک) in Luri, Kurdish and Persian in Iran, and maskah (مسکه) in Afghanistan. This is done by pouring the milk in the waterskin, usually made of deer or sheep skin, and shaking it for hours, sometimes using a wooden structure to keep the waterskin above the ground with woolen strings to make the task easier.  In Pakistan, Ayran is sometimes called Namkeen Lassi.

History
Ayran was developed in  Central Asia and historically was consumed by Turkic tribes.According to Nevin Halıcı, ayran was consumed by Turkic people of Central Asia. A c. 1000 CE Turkic dictionary, Dīwān ul-Lughat al-Turk, defines ayran as a "drink made out of milk". 

Similar drinks exist elsewhere, such as doogh (دوغ), an Iranian fermented drink that has long been a popular drink and was consumed in ancient Iran (Persia). Described by an 1886 source as a cold drink of curdled milk and water seasoned with mint, its name (Doogh) derives from the Persian word for milking, dooshidan.

Other similar drinks include t’an in Armenia and lassi in Southern Asia and are popular in Asian countries; however, they can differ from doogh.

Regional names of the drink and its variations are: ;  šinīna or  eayran;  t'an; ; ;   ;  shrombey; ;  daughe;  xinogala or αριάνι ariani; Pontic Greek: αΐραν ayran; .

Variations

Salt, black pepper, dried mint, and lime juice can be mixed in. Diced cucumbers can be added to provide a crunchy texture to the beverage. Some varieties of doogh are carbonated. In Balkan countries, the drink is usually consumed for breakfast or lunch, usually combined with pastries like banitsa, börek or other pastries.

In Afghanistan, ayran (known as dogh in Afghanistan) is a summer beverage. It is made with yogurt, salt, mint, diced cucumbers, lime, and is sometimes carbonated. It is enjoyed alongside bolani, Afghan flatbread, and other picnic foods.

In Albania, ayran is known as dhallë and is made exclusively with yogurt, salt and water and it is served cold. The name 'dhallë' comes from mixed and shaken.

In Cyprus, ayran, known as ayrani (αϊρανι) in Greek, is made with sour sheep yogurt, water, salt and mint.

In northern and western India, the local variant is called tchaas (छास) or taak (ताक). It consists of cultured yogurt (दही), water, rock salt, corriander and cumin powder. This is different to the thicker, creamier and sweet lassi. Tchaas is consumed after lunch especially on hot summer days.

Turkish national drink status 
Recep Tayyip Erdoğan, a Turkish politician who has held the posts of President and Prime Minister, has promoted ayran as a national drink. Speaking at a 2013 WHO Global Alcohol Policy Conference held in Istanbul, Erdoğan contrasted ayran with alcohol, which he claimed was a recent introduction to Turkey.

Nevertheless, sales of ayran in Turkey lag behind other non-alcoholic beverages. According to a 2015 joint statement from the Soft Drink Producers Association, the Sparkling Water Producers Association, and the Milk Producers and Exporters Union of Turkey, ayran consumption during Ramadan had declined every year for the years 2010 to 2015.

In 2015, Turkey's Ministry of Customs and Trade, imposed a 220,000 TL fine (approximately $70,000) on state-owned Çaykur manufacturers, stating that ayran had been "insulted without reason" in one of their advertisements for iced tea, in which the rapper Ceza rapped that ayran makes him sleepy; the ministry halted advertisements of Çaykur's competing ice-tea product.

Gallery

See also 

 Ash-e doogh, Iranian food in the form of soup
 Borhani, yogurt-based drink from Bangladesh
 Calpis, Japanese yogurt-based soft drink
 Chal, fermented camel's milk
 Chaas, yogurt-based drink made with yogurt, salt and water, and occasional mint and coriander leaves
 Chalap, beverage consisting of yogurt, salt, and carbonated water
 Kefir, fermented milk drink made with yeast grains
 Kumis, fermented mare's milk drink
 Lassi, yogurt-based drink from the Indian subcontinent 
 Milkis, Korean carbonated yogurt milk
 Qatiq, fermented-milk beverage
 Yayık ayranı, Turkish soured and churned yogurt-based drink

References

External links
FAO international standards

Afghan cuisine
Armenian drinks
Azerbaijani drinks
Greek cuisine
Iranian drinks
Iraqi cuisine
Israeli cuisine
Palestinian cuisine
Lebanese cuisine
Assyrian cuisine
Jordanian cuisine
Kurdish cuisine
Pashtun cuisine
Syrian cuisine
Turkish drinks
Cypriot cuisine
Yogurt-based drinks
Fermented dairy products
Fermented drinks
Sour foods
Albanian drinks
Bulgarian drinks
Pakistani drinks